Doctor Praetorius or Woman's Doctor Praetorius is a 1950 West German comedy drama film directed by Karl Peter Gillmann and Curt Goetz and starring Goetz, Valerie von Martens and Erich Ponto. It was based on Goetz's own hit play which was the following year made into an American film People Will Talk. A second German film Praetorius was released in 1965, starring Heinz Rühmann.

It was shot at the Göttingen Studios. The film's sets were designed by Walter Haag.

Plot 
Because of his kindness and philanthropy, the doctor enjoys great popularity among patients, the medical staff and the student body alike. Only his colleague Prof. Speiter begrudges his success.

When his patient Maria Violetta wants to commit suicide because of an extramarital pregnancy, Prätorius takes care of the young woman. When he wants to carefully prepare her father for the news, this Praetorius considers a more than welcome admirer of his daughter. Since a deep affection has developed between the doctor and his patient, the two eventually marry. The private happiness of the two fuels the envy of Prof. Speiter. Through Praetorius' mysterious factotum Shunderson, he finally believes he can uncover dark points from the doctor's past. But Praetorius succeeds in refuting all allegations before a court of honor with wit and astonishing revelations.

In Goetz's production, particularly tragicomic and melancholic moments of the play are emphasized. Humanistic values ​​are emphasized and the problems of abortion and the death penalty are critically examined. In addition, Praetorius strives as constantly as in vain to research the microbe of human stupidity, which he believes to be the cause of envy, hatred and war.

Cast

References

Bibliography

External links 
 

1950 films
1950 comedy-drama films
German comedy-drama films
West German films
1950s German-language films
German films based on plays
Films based on works by Curt Goetz
Medical-themed films
Films directed by Curt Goetz
German black-and-white films
1950s German films
Films shot at Göttingen Studios